The National Collegiate Athletic Association (NCAA) is a nonprofit organization that regulates student athletics among about 1,100 schools in the United States, Canada, and Puerto Rico. It also organizes the athletic programs of colleges and universities in the United States and Canada and helps over 500,000 college student athletes who compete annually in college sports. The organization is headquartered in Indianapolis, Indiana.

Until 1957, the NCAA was a single division for all schools. That year, the NCAA split into the University Division and the College Division. In August 1973, the current three-division system of Division I, Division II, and Division III was adopted by the NCAA membership in a special convention. Under NCAA rules, Division I and Division II schools can offer scholarships to athletes for playing a sport. Division III schools may not offer any athletic scholarships. Generally, larger schools compete in Division I and smaller schools in II and III. Division I football was further divided into I-A and I-AA in 1978, while Division I programs that did not have football teams were known as I-AAA. In 2006, Divisions I-A and I-AA were respectively renamed the Football Bowl Subdivision (FBS) and Football Championship Subdivision (FCS). In its 2016–17 fiscal year, the NCAA took in $1.06 billion in revenue, over 82% of which was generated by the Division I men's basketball tournament.

Controversially, the NCAA formerly capped the benefits that collegiate athletes could receive from their schools. The consensus among economists is these caps for men's basketball and football players benefit the athletes' schools (through rent-seeking) at the expense of the athletes. Economists have subsequently characterized the NCAA as a cartel. On June 21, 2021, the Supreme Court of the United States unanimously ruled that the education-related benefit caps the NCAA imposes on student athletes are in violation of US antitrust law.

History

Formation and early years

Intercollegiate sports began in the United States in 1852 when crews from Harvard and Yale universities met in a challenge race in the sport of rowing. As rowing remained the preeminent sport in the country into the late-1800s, many of the initial debates about collegiate athletic eligibility and purpose were settled through organizations like the Rowing Association of American Colleges and the Intercollegiate Rowing Association. As other sports emerged, notably football and basketball, many of these same concepts and standards were adopted. Football, in particular, began to emerge as a marquee sport, but the rules of the game itself were in constant flux and often had to be adapted for each contest.

The NCAA dates its formation to two White House conferences convened by President Theodore Roosevelt in the early 20th century in response to repeated injuries and deaths in college football which had "prompted many college and universities to discontinue the sport." Following those White House meetings and the reforms which had resulted, Chancellor Henry MacCracken of New York University organized a meeting of 13 colleges and universities to initiate changes in football playing rules; at a follow-on meeting on December 28, 1905, in New York, 62 higher-education institutions became charter members of the Intercollegiate Athletic Association of the United States (IAAUS). The IAAUS was officially established on March 31, 1906, and took its present name, the NCAA, in 1910.

For several years, the NCAA was a discussion group and rules-making body, but in 1921, the first NCAA national championship was conducted: the National Collegiate Track and Field Championships. Gradually, more rules committees were formed and more championships were created, including a basketball championship in 1939.

A series of crises brought the NCAA to a crossroads after World War II. The "Sanity Code" – adopted to establish guidelines for recruiting and financial aid – failed to curb abuses, and the Association needed to find more effective ways to curtail its membership. Postseason football games were multiplying with little control, and member schools were increasingly concerned about how the new medium of television would affect football attendance.

The complexity of those problems and the growth in membership and championships demonstrated the need for full-time professional leadership. Walter Byers, previously a part-time executive assistant, was named executive director in 1951, and a national headquarters was established in Kansas City, Missouri in 1952.

Byers wasted no time placing his stamp on the Association. A program to control live television of football games was approved, the annual Convention delegated enforcement powers to the Association's Council, and legislation was adopted governing postseason bowl games.

1970s–present

As college athletics grew, the scope of the nation's athletics programs diverged, forcing the NCAA to create a structure that recognized varying levels of emphasis. In 1973, the association's membership was divided into three legislative and competitive divisions – I, II, and III. Five years later in 1978, Division I members voted to create subdivisions I-A and I-AA (renamed the Football Bowl Subdivision and the Football Championship Subdivision in 2006) in football.

Until the 1980s, the association did not govern women's athletics. Instead, the Association for Intercollegiate Athletics for Women (AIAW), with nearly 1,000 member schools, governed women's collegiate sports in the United States. The AIAW was in a vulnerable position that precipitated conflicts with the NCAA in the early-1980s. Following a one-year overlap in which both organizations staged women's championships, the AIAW discontinued operation, and most member schools continued their women's athletics programs under the governance of the NCAA. By 1982 all divisions of the NCAA offered national championship events for women's athletics. A year later in 1983, the 75th Convention approved an expansion to plan women's athletic program services and pushed for a women's championship program.

By the 1980s, televised college football had become a larger source of income for the NCAA. In September 1981, the Board of Regents of the University of Oklahoma and the University of Georgia Athletic Association filed suit against the NCAA in district court in Oklahoma. The plaintiffs stated that the NCAA's football television plan constituted price fixing, output restraints, boycott, and monopolizing, all of which were illegal under the Sherman Act. The NCAA argued that its pro-competitive and non-commercial justifications for the plan – protection of live gate, maintenance of competitive balance among NCAA member institutions, and the creation of a more attractive "product" to compete with other forms of entertainment – combined to make the plan reasonable. In September 1982, the district court found in favor of the plaintiffs, ruling that the plan violated antitrust laws. It enjoined the association from enforcing the contract. The NCAA appealed all the way to the United States Supreme Court, but lost in 1984 in a 7–2 ruling NCAA v. Board of Regents of the University of Oklahoma. (If the television contracts the NCAA had with ABC, CBS, and ESPN had remained in effect for the 1984 season, they would have generated some $73.6 million for the association and its members.)

In 1999, the NCAA was sued for discriminating against female athletes under Title IX for systematically giving men in graduate school more waivers than a woman to participate in college sports. In National Collegiate Athletic Association v. Smith, 525 U.S. 459 (1999) the U.S. Supreme Court ruled that the NCAA was not subject to that law, without reviewing the merits of the discrimination claim.

Over the last two decades recruiting international athletes has become a growing trend among NCAA institutions. For example, most German athletes outside of Germany are based at US universities. For many European athletes, the American universities are the only option to pursue an academic and athletic career at the same time. Many of these students come to the US with high academic expectations and aspirations.

In 2009, Simon Fraser University in Burnaby, British Columbia, Canada, became the NCAA's first non-US member institution, joining Division II. In 2018, Division II membership approved allowing schools from Mexico to apply for membership; CETYS of Tijuana, Baja California expressed significant interest in joining at the time.

In 2014, the NCAA set a record high of $989 million in net revenue. Just shy of $1 billion, it is among the highest of all large sports organizations.

During the NCAA's 2022 annual convention, the membership ratified a new version of the organization's constitution. The new constitution dramatically simplifies a rulebook that many college sports leaders saw as increasingly bloated.

It also reduces the size of the NCAA Board of Governors from 20 to 9, and guarantees that current and former athletes have voting representation on both the NCAA board and the governing bodies of each NCAA division. The new constitution was the first step in a reorganization process in which each division will have the right to set its own rules, with no approval needed from the rest of the NCAA membership.

Notable court cases
 In the late-1940s, there were only two colleges in the country, Notre Dame and Pennsylvania, with national TV contracts, a considerable source of revenue. In 1951, the NCAA voted to prohibit any live TV broadcast of college football games during the season. No sooner had the NCAA voted to ban television than public outcry forced it to retreat. Instead, the NCAA voted to restrict the number of televised games for each team to stop the slide in gate attendance. University of Pennsylvania president Harold Stassen defied the monopoly and renewed its contract with ABC. Eventually, Penn dropped its suit when the NCAA, refusing Penn's request that the U.S. Attorney General rule on the legality of the NCAA's restrictive plan, threatened to expel the university from the association. Notre Dame continued televising its games through 1953, working around the ban by filming its games, then broadcasting them the next evening.
In 1957, the Colorado Supreme Court dismissed a lawsuit filed by the family of deceased Trinidad College football player Ray Herbert Dennison. Despite suffering a lethal concussion injury on the field in a game versus Fort Lewis A&M College, Dennison was not entitled to any compensation because he was not under a contractual obligation to play football. Furthermore, the court stated that the "college did not receive a direct benefit from the activities, since the college was not in the football business and received no benefit from this field of recreation".
 In 1977, prompted partly by the Tarkanian Case, the US Congress initiated an investigation into the NCAA. It, combined with Tarkanian's case, forced the NCAA's internal files into the public record.
 In 1998, the NCAA settled a $2.5 million lawsuit filed by former UNLV basketball coach, Jerry Tarkanian. Tarkanian sued the NCAA after he was forced to resign from UNLV, where he had been head coach from 1973 to 1992. The suit claimed the agency singled him out, penalizing the university's basketball program three times in that span. Tarkanian said, "They can never, ever, make up for all the pain and agony they caused me. All I can say is that for 25 years they beat the hell out of me". The NCAA said that it regretted the long battle and it now has more understanding of Tarkanian's position and that the case has changed the enforcement process for the better.
 In 1999, the NCAA was sued for discriminating against female athletes under Title IX for systematically giving men in graduate school more waivers than a woman to participate in college sports. In National Collegiate Athletic Association v. Smith, the U.S. Supreme Court ruled that the NCAA was not subject to that law, without reviewing the merits of the discrimination claim.
 In 2007, the case of White et al. v. NCAA, No. CV 06-999-RGK (C.D. Cal. September 20, 2006) was brought by former NCAA student-athletes Jason White, Brian Pollack, Jovan Harris, and Chris Craig as a class action lawsuit. They argued that the NCAA's current limits on a full scholarship or grant-in-aid was a violation of federal antitrust laws. Their reasoning was that in the absence of such a limit, NCAA member schools would be free to offer any financial aid packages they desired to recruit the student and athlete. The NCAA settled before a ruling by the court, by agreeing to set up the Former Student-Athlete Fund to "assist qualified candidates applying for receipt of career development expenses and/or reimbursement of educational expenses under the terms of the agreement with plaintiffs in a federal antitrust lawsuit."
 In 2013, Jay Bilas claimed that the NCAA was taking advantage of individual players through jersey sales in its store. Specifically, he typed the names of several top college football players, Tajh Boyd, Teddy Bridgewater, Jadeveon Clowney, Johnny Manziel, and A. J. McCarron, into the search engine of the NCAA's official online store. The search results returned corresponding numbered team jerseys. The NCAA subsequently removed the team jerseys listed on its site. 
 In March 2014, four players filed a class action antitrust lawsuit (O'Bannon v. NCAA), alleging that the NCAA and its five dominant conferences are an "unlawful cartel". The suit charges that NCAA caps on the value of athletic scholarships have "illegally restricted the earning power of football and men's basketball players while making billions off their labor". Tulane University Sports Law Program Director Gabe Feldman called the suit "an instantly credible threat to the NCAA." On September 30, 2015, the U.S. Court of Appeals for the Ninth Circuit ruled that limiting compensation to the cost of an athlete's attendance at a university was sufficient. It simultaneously ruled against a federal judge's proposal to pay student athletes $5,000 per year in deferred compensation.
In August 2015, the National Labor Relations Board reversed a decision settled in the prior year that classified members of Northwestern University's scholarship football players as employees, thus, granting them the right to collectively bargain for their rights. The unionization efforts were a direct effort led by the College Athletes Player Association and Kain Colter, who operated with the support of the United Steelworkers group. The case was ultimately struck down due to difficulties in applying the ruling across both public and private institutions. The NCAA made several improvements to the value of athletic scholarships and the quality of healthcare coverage in response to this movement by the Northwestern football players. These reforms included guaranteeing the entire four years of scholarship in the event of a career-ending injury, the implementation of “cost of attendance” stipends, the institution of “unlimited” athlete meal plans, and protections for the name, image, and likeness of athletes by third parties such as Electronic Arts.
In 2018 former UCF kicker Donald De La Haye filed a lawsuit alleging that the university violated his First Amendment rights when it rescinded his full athletic scholarship over the income De La Haye made from his monetized YouTube channel, which he started before he attended college. UCF argued De La Haye violated the NCAA policy forbidding student-athletes from using their likenesses to make money. De La Haye ultimately settled with UCF so that he could obtain his degree from the university.
In June 2021 the Supreme Court of the United States unanimously affirmed a ruling in NCAA v. Alston that provides for an incremental increase in how college athletes can be compensated. Justice Neil Gorsuch wrote the court's opinion, which upheld a district court judge's decision that the NCAA was violating antitrust law by placing limits on the education-related benefits that schools can provide to athletes. The decision allows schools to provide their athletes with unlimited compensation as long as it is some way connected to their education. The idea that college athletes should not be paid, a fundamental tenet of the 115-year-old NCAA, has faced increasing scrutiny in recent years. Federal antitrust lawsuits have slowly eroded strict amateurism rules during the past decade.

Headquarters

The modern era of the NCAA began in July 1955 when its executive director, Kansas City, Missouri native Walter Byers, moved the organization's headquarters from the LaSalle Hotel in Chicago (where its offices were shared by the headquarters of the Big Ten Conference) to the Fairfax Building in Downtown Kansas City. The move was intended to separate the NCAA from the direct influence of any individual conference and keep it centrally located.

The Fairfax was a block from Municipal Auditorium which had hosted men's basketball Final Four games in 1940, 1941, and 1942. After Byers moved the headquarters to Kansas City, the championships would be held in Municipal Auditorium in 1953, 1954, 1955, 1957, 1961, and 1964. The Fairfax office consisted of three rooms with no air conditioning. Byers' staff consisted of four people: an assistant, two secretaries, and a bookkeeper.

In 1989, the organization moved  farther south to Overland Park, Kansas.

The NCAA was dissatisfied with its Johnson County, Kansas suburban location, noting that its location on the southern edges of the Kansas City suburbs was more than 40 minutes from Kansas City International Airport. They also noted that the suburban location was not drawing visitors to its new visitors' center.

In 1997, it asked for bids for a new headquarters. Various cities competed for a new headquarters with the two finalists being Kansas City and Indianapolis. Kansas City proposed to relocate the NCAA back downtown near the Crown Center complex and would locate the visitors' center in Union Station. However Kansas City's main sports venue Kemper Arena was nearly 30 years old. Indianapolis argued that it was in fact more central than Kansas City in that two-thirds of the members are east of the Mississippi River. The 50,000-seat RCA Dome far eclipsed the 17,000-seat Kemper Arena. In 1999, the NCAA moved its 300-member staff to its new headquarters in the White River State Park in a four-story  facility on the west edge of downtown Indianapolis, Indiana. Adjacent to the headquarters is the  NCAA Hall of Champions.

Structure
The NCAA's Board of Governors (formerly known as the Executive Committee) is the main body within the NCAA. This body elects the NCAA's president.

The NCAA's legislative structure is broken down into cabinets and committees, consisting of various representatives of its member schools. These may be broken down further into sub-committees. The legislation is then passed on to the Management Council, which oversees all the cabinets and committees, and also includes representatives from the schools, such as athletic directors and faculty advisers. Management Council legislation goes on to the Board of Directors, which consists of school presidents, for final approval. The NCAA national office staff provides support by acting as guides, liaisons, researchers, and by managing public and media relations.

The NCAA runs the officiating software company ArbiterSports, based in Sandy, Utah, a joint venture between two subsidiaries of the NCAA, Arbiter LLC and eOfficials LLC. The NCAA's stated objective for the venture is to help improve the fairness, quality, and consistency of officiating across amateur athletics.

Presidents of the NCAA
The NCAA had no full-time administrator until 1951, when Walter Byers was appointed executive director. In 1998, the title was changed to president.
 Walter Byers 1951–1988 (Executive Director)
 James Frank 1981–1983 (Executive Director)
 Dick Schultz 1988–1993 
 Judith Sweet 1991–1993 
 Cedric Dempsey 1994–2002
 Myles Brand 2003–2009
 Jim Isch 2009–2010 (interim)
 Mark Emmert 2010–2023
 Charlie Baker (incumbent)

Chief medical officer 
In 2013, the NCAA hired Brian Hainline as its first chief medical officer.

Division history
Before 1957, all NCAA sports used a single division of competition. In 1957 the NCAA split into two divisions for men's basketball only, with major programs making up the University Division and smaller programs making up the College Division. The names could be confusing, as some schools with "University" in their name still competed in the College Division while some with "College" in their name competed in the University Division. The split gradually took hold in other sports as well. Records from before the split were inherited by the University Division.

In 1973 the College Division split up between teams that wanted to grant athletic scholarships (becoming Division II, which inherited the College Division's records and history) and teams that did not (becoming Division III), and the University Division was renamed to Division I. Division I split into two subdivisions for football only in 1978 (though both still under the Division I name), with Division I-A consisting of major teams who would continue to compete in bowl games and use various polls to decide its champion and Division I-AA consisting of smaller teams who would compete in the new NCAA Football Tournament to decide its champion. Division I schools without football teams were known as Division I-AAA. In 2006, Division I-A became the Football Bowl Subdivision (FBS), Division I-AA became the Football Championship Subdivision (FCS), and Division I-AAA became Division I non-football. The changes were in name only with no significant structural differences to the organization.

"National Collegiate" sports 
For some less-popular sports, the NCAA does not separate teams into their usual divisions and instead holds only one tournament to decide a single national champion between all three divisions (except for women's ice hockey and men's indoor volleyball, where the National Collegiate championship only features teams from Division I and Division II and a separate championship is contested for only Division III). The 11 sports which use the National Collegiate format, also called the single-division format, are women's bowling, fencing, men's gymnastics, women's gymnastics, women's ice hockey, rifle, skiing, men's indoor volleyball, women's beach volleyball, men's water polo, and women's water polo. The NCAA considers a National Collegiate title equivalent to a Division I title even if the champion is primarily a member of Division II or III. These championships are largely dominated by teams that are otherwise members of Division I, but current non-Division I teams have won 40 National Collegiate championships since the University Division/College Division split as of 2022 (2 in bowling, 20 in fencing, 8 in women's ice hockey, and 10 in rifle). Division III schools are allowed to grant athletic scholarships to students who compete in National Collegiate sports, though most do not.

Men's ice hockey uses a similar but not identical "National Collegiate" format as women's ice hockey and men's indoor volleyball (Division III has its own championship but several Division III teams compete in Division I for men's ice hockey), but its top-level championship is branded as a "Division I" championship. While the NCAA has not explained why it is the only sport with this distinction, the NCAA held a separate Division II championship from 1978–1984 and again from 1993–1999. As of 2022, 12 Division I men's ice hockey championships have been won by current non-Division I teams since the University Division/College Division split. Like with National Collegiate sports, schools that are otherwise members of Division III who compete in Division I for men's ice hockey are allowed to grant athletic scholarships for the sport.

All sports used the National Collegiate format until 1957, when the NCAA was split into the University Division and College Division (which itself was split into Divisions II and III in 1973). The only sport that immediately saw a change after the 1957 split was basketball; all other sports continued to use the National Collegiate format for at least one season, and usually many more. Some sports that began after the split once used the format and no longer do. This include men's and women's lacrosse, women's rowing, women's soccer, and men's and women's indoor track & field.

Some sports, including men's and women's golf, men's ice hockey, men's lacrosse, and men's and women's soccer used to have a combined championship between Divisions II and III, but these were known as a "Division II/III championship" in most cases. The NCAA considered these titles equivalent to a Division II title. No sport currently uses this format.

Player eligibility

The NCAA requires all of its athletes to be amateurs. All incoming athletes must be certified as amateurs. To remain eligible, athletes must not sign contract with sports clubs, earn a salary playing a sport, try out for professional sports, or enter into agreements with agents.

To participate in college athletics in their freshman year, the NCAA requires that students meet three criteria: having graduated from high school, be completing the minimum required academic courses, and having qualifying grade-point average (GPA).

The 16 academic credits are four courses in English, two courses in math, two classes in social science, two in natural or physical science, and one additional course in English, math, natural or physical science, or another academic course such as a foreign language.

To meet the Division I requirements for grade point average, the lowest possible high school GPA a student may have to be eligible with to play in their freshman year is a 2.30 (2.20 for Division II or III), but they are allowed to play beginning in their second year with a GPA of 2.00.

As of the 2017–18 school year, a high school student may sign a letter of intent to enter and play football for a Division I or Division II college in either of two periods. The first, introduced in 2017–18, is a three-day period in mid-December, coinciding with the first three days of the previously existing signing period for junior college players. The second period, which before 2017 was the only one allowed for signings of high school players, starts on the first Wednesday in February. In August 2011, the NCAA announced plans to raise academic requirements for postseason competition, including its two most prominent competitions, football's now-defunct Bowl Championship Series (replaced in 2014 by the College Football Playoff) and the Division I men's basketball tournament; the new requirement, which are based on an "Academic Progress Rate" (APR) that measures retention and graduation rates, and is calculated on a four-year, rolling basis. The changes raise the rate from 900 to 930, which represents a 50% graduation rate.

Student-athletes can accept prize money from tournaments or competitions if they do not exceed the total expenses from the event. For example, during high school, D1 tennis players may take up to $10,000 in total prize money. If the student surpassed the amount of $10,000 of prize money in a calendar year, they would lose eligibility.

Students are generally allowed to compete athletically for four years. Athletes are allowed to sit out a year while still attending school but not lose a year of eligibility by redshirting. In other words, a student has five years from the time they begin college to play four seasons.

NCAA sponsored sports
The NCAA currently awards 90 national championships yearly – 46 women's, 41 men's, and 3 coed championships for fencing, rifle, and skiing. Sports sanctioned by the NCAA include the following: basketball, baseball (men), beach volleyball (women), softball (women), football (men), cross country, field hockey (women), bowling (women), golf, fencing (coeducational), lacrosse, soccer, gymnastics, rowing (women), volleyball, ice hockey, water polo, rifle (coeducational), tennis, skiing (coeducational), track and field, swimming and diving, and wrestling (men). The newest sport to be officially sanctioned is beach volleyball, which held its first championship in spring 2016. The NCAA had called the sport "sand volleyball" until June 23, 2015, when it announced that it would use the internationally recognized name of "beach volleyball".

The Football Bowl Subdivision of Division I determines its own champion separately from the NCAA via the College Football Playoff; this is not an official NCAA championship (see below).

The NCAA awards championships in the sports listed below. For the three coeducational championships, women's dates reflect the first championship that was open to women.

 In addition to the sports above, the NCAA sanctioned a boxing championship from 1932 to 1960. The NCAA discontinued boxing following declines in the sport during the 1950s and following the death of a boxer at the 1960 NCAA tournament.
 The NCAA also formerly sanctioned a trampoline championship. Prior to 1969, it was one of the events in the men's gymnastics championship, but it was given its own championship in 1969 and 1970 before being dropped completely.

The number of teams (school programs) that compete in each sport in their respective division as of the 2021–22 academic year are as follows:

Men's programs

Women's programs

Notes:

Emerging sports for women

In addition to the above sports, the NCAA recognizes Emerging Sports for Women. These sports have scholarship limitations for each sport, but do not currently have officially sanctioned NCAA championships. A member institution may use these sports to meet the required level of sports sponsorship for its division. An "Emerging Sport" must gain championship status (minimum 40 varsity programs for team sports, except 28 for Division III) within 10 years, or show steady progress toward that goal to remain on the list. Until then, it is under the auspices of the NCAA and its respective institutions. Emerging Sport status allows for competition to include club teams to satisfy the minimum number of competitions bylaw established by the NCAA.

The five sports currently designated as Emerging Sports for Women are:
 Acrobatics & tumbling
 Equestrian
 Rugby
 Triathlon
 Wrestling

Sports added and dropped
The popularity of each of these sports programs has changed over time. Between 1988–89 and 2010–11, NCAA schools had net additions of 510 men's teams and 2,703 women's teams.

The following tables show the changes over time in the number of NCAA schools across all three divisions combined sponsoring each of the men's and women's team sports.

Men's sports
The men's sports with the biggest net gains during the 1988/89 to 2010/11 period were indoor track and field, lacrosse, and cross country (each with more than 100 net gains). The men's sports with the biggest losses were wrestling (−104 teams), tennis, and rifle; the men's team sport with the most net losses was water polo. Other reports show that 355 college wrestling programs have been eliminated since 2000; 212 men's gymnastics programs have been eliminated since 1969 with only 17 programs remaining as of 2013.

Additionally, eight NCAA sports—all men's sports—were sponsored by fewer Division I schools in 2020 than in 1990, despite the D-I membership having increased by nearly 60 schools during that period. Four of these sports, namely wrestling, swimming & diving, gymnastics, and tennis, lost more than 20 net teams during that timeframe. As a proportion of D-I membership, men's tennis took the greatest hit; 71.5% of D-I members had men's tennis in 2020, compared to 93.2% in 1990.

The following table lists the men's individual DI sports with at least 5,000 participating athletes. Sports are ranked by number of athletes.

Women's sports
The women's sports with the biggest net gains during the 1988–89 to 2010–11 period were soccer (+599 teams), golf, and indoor track and field; no women's sports programs experienced double-digit net losses.

The following table lists the women's individual NCAA sports with at least 1,000 participating athletes. Sports are ranked by number of athletes.

 Equestrian was not a women's varsity sport in 1982 and the NCAA report does not include the number of teams for that year. Equestrian is first listed in the NCAA report in 1988–89 with 41 teams, and so the number of teams for that season is listed in the table above.

Championships

Trophies
For every NCAA sanctioned sport other than Division I FBS football, the NCAA awards trophies with gold, silver, and bronze plating for the first-, second-, and third-place teams respectively. In the case of the NCAA basketball tournaments, both semifinalists who did not make the championship game receive bronze plated trophies for third place (prior to 1982 the teams played a "consolation" game to determine third place). Similar trophies are awarded to both semifinalists in the NCAA football tournaments (which are conducted in Division I FCS and both lower divisions), which have never had a third-place game. Winning teams maintain permanent possession of these trophies unless it is later found that they were won via serious rules violations.

Starting with the 2001–02 season, and again in the 2007–08 season, the trophies were changed. Starting in the 2006 basketball season, teams that make the Final Four in the Division I tournament receive bronze-plated "regional championship" trophies upon winning their Regional Championship which state the region they won and have the Final Four logo. The teams that make the National Championship game receive an additional trophy that is gold-plated for the winner. Starting in the mid-1990s, the National Champions in men's and women's basketball receive an elaborate trophy with a black marble base and crystal "neck" with a removable crystal basketball following the presentation of the standard NCAA Championship trophy.

As of May 30, 2022, Stanford, UCLA, and Southern California (USC) have the most NCAA championships. Stanford has won 131 and UCLA has won 119 NCAA team championships in men's and women's sports, while USC is third with 111.

Football Bowl Subdivision

The NCAA has never sanctioned an official championship for its highest level of football, now known as Division I FBS. Instead, several outside bodies award their own titles. The NCAA does not hold a championship tournament or game for Division I FBS football. In the past, teams that placed first in any of a number of season-ending media polls, most notable the AP Poll of writers and the Coaches Poll, were said to have won the "national championship".

From 2014 through 2023, the College Football Playoff – a consortium of the conferences and independent schools that compete in Division I FBS and six bowl games – has arranged to place the top four teams (based on a thirteen-member committee that selects and seeds the teams) into two semifinal games, with the winners advancing to compete in the College Football Playoff National Championship, which is not officially sanctioned or recognized by the NCAA. The winner of the game receives a trophy; since the NCAA awards no national championship for Division I FBS football, this trophy does not denote NCAA as other NCAA college sports national championship trophies do. The playoff will expand to 12 teams starting in 2024.

Conferences

The NCAA is divided into three levels of conferences, Division I, Division II, and Division III, organized in declining program size, as well as numerous sub-divisions. Most schools belong to a primary "multisport conference" for most of their sports. A schools may also belong to another conference for a particular sport.

The Division I, Division II, and Division III "Independents" listed below are not conferences per se; it is a designation used for schools that do not belong to a conference for a particular sport. These schools may still have conference memberships for other sports. For example, Notre Dame primarily belongs to the Atlantic Coast Conference for most sports, but its ice hockey team competes in the Big Ten Conference and its football team is an independent.

Division I

Among the NCAA regulations, each Division I conference defined as "multisport conference" must have at least seven active Division I member institutions. These conferences must sponsor at least 12 sports, including six sports for men and six for women. At least seven active members in a multisport conference must sponsor both men's and women's basketball. For non-football conferences, they must sponsor at least two men's team sports other than basketball. Teams that consist of both men and women are counted as men's teams for sports sponsorship purposes.

For all institutions in the Division I Football Bowl Subdivision, they have additional requirements. Among them, they must participate in conference play in at least six men's and eight women's sports, including football, men's and women's basketball, and at least two other women's team sports.

Notes
 FBS conferences in football are denoted with an asterisk (*)
 FCS conferences in football are denoted with two asterisks (**)
 Conferences that do not sponsor football or basketball are in italics

 American Athletic Conference (The American) *
 America East Conference
 ASUN Conference **
 Atlantic 10 Conference (A-10)
 Atlantic Coast Conference (ACC) *
 Big 12 Conference (Big 12) *
 Big East Conference
 Big Sky Conference **
 Big South Conference **
 Big Ten Conference (Big Ten or B1G) *
 Big West Conference
 Coastal Collegiate Sports Association (CCSA)
 Colonial Athletic Association (CAA) ** 
 Conference USA (C-USA) *
 Horizon League 
 Ivy League **
 Metro Atlantic Athletic Conference (MAAC) 
 Mid-American Conference (MAC) 
 Mid-Eastern Athletic Conference (MEAC) **
 Missouri Valley Conference (MVC) 
 Mountain Pacific Sports Federation (MPSF)
 Mountain West Conference (MW) *
 Northeast Conference (NEC) **
 Ohio Valley Conference (OVC) **
 Pac-12 Conference (Pac-12) *
 Patriot League **
 Southeastern Conference (SEC) *
 Southern Conference (SoCon) **
 Southland Conference **
 Southwestern Athletic Conference (SWAC) **
 The Summit League (The Summit)
 Sun Belt Conference (SBC) *
 West Coast Conference (WCC)
 Western Athletic Conference (WAC) **
 NCAA Division I Independents

Division I FCS football-only conferences
 Missouri Valley Football Conference
 Pioneer Football League

Division I hockey-only conferences

Division I ice hockey has a different conference structure than the above multisport conferences. These schools have memberships in other conferences for other sports.

Men only
 Atlantic Hockey
 Central Collegiate Hockey Association (CCHA) – revived in 2021; previously operated from 1971–2013
 National Collegiate Hockey Conference (NCHC)

Women only
 College Hockey America
 New England Women's Hockey Alliance (NEWHA)
 Western Collegiate Hockey Association (WCHA)

Men and women
 ECAC Hockey
 Hockey East

Division II

Among the NCAA regulations, Division II institutions must sponsor at least five sports for men and five for women (or four for men and six for women), with two team sports for each sex, and each playing season represented by each sex. Teams that consist of both men and women are counted as men's teams for sports sponsorship purposes.

 California Collegiate Athletic Association (CCAA)
 Central Atlantic Collegiate Conference (CACC)
 Central Intercollegiate Athletic Association (CIAA)
 Conference Carolinas (CC)
 East Coast Conference (ECC)
 Great American Conference (GAC)
 Great Lakes Intercollegiate Athletic Conference (GLIAC)
 Great Lakes Valley Conference (GLVC)
 Great Midwest Athletic Conference (G-MAC)
 Great Northwest Athletic Conference (GNAC)
 Gulf South Conference (GSC)
 Lone Star Conference (LSC)
 Mid-America Intercollegiate Athletics Association (MIAA)
 Mountain East Conference (MEC)
 Northeast-10 Conference (NE-10)
 Northern Sun Intercollegiate Conference (NSIC)
 Pacific West Conference (PacWest)
 Peach Belt Conference (PBC)
 Pennsylvania State Athletic Conference (PSAC)
 Rocky Mountain Athletic Conference (RMAC)
 South Atlantic Conference (SAC)
 Southern Intercollegiate Athletic Conference (SIAC)
 Sunshine State Conference (SSC)
 NCAA Division II Independents

Division III

Unlike the other two divisions, Division III institutions cannot offer athletic scholarships. Among the other NCAA Division III requirements, all institutions, regardless of enrollment, must sponsor at least three team sports for each sex/gender, and each playing season represented by each sex/gender. Furthermore, a sports sponsorship rule unique to Division III is that the total number of sports that must be sponsored differs by a school's full-time undergraduate enrollment: schools with an enrollment of 1,000 or fewer must sponsor at least five sports for men and five for women; those with larger enrollments must sponsor six men's and six women's sports. As in the other divisions, teams that include both men and women are treated as men's sports for the purpose of these regulations.

 Allegheny Mountain Collegiate Conference (AMCC)
 American Rivers Conference (ARC)
 American Southwest Conference (ASC)
 Atlantic East Conference (AEC)
 Centennial Conference (Centennial)
 City University of New York Athletic Conference (CUNYAC)
 Coast to Coast Athletic Conference (C2C)
 College Conference of Illinois and Wisconsin (CCIW)
 Collegiate Conference of the South (CCS)
 Colonial States Athletic Conference (CSAC)
 Commonwealth Coast Conference (CCC)
 CCC fully absorbed Commonwealth Coast Football, previously a CCC-administered but technically separate football-only league, in 2022. The football league was originally the New England Football Conference before being taken over by CCC in 2017.
 Empire 8 (E8)
 Great Northeast Athletic Conference (GNAC)
 Heartland Collegiate Athletic Conference (HCAC)
 Landmark Conference (Landmark)
 Liberty League (Liberty)
 Little East Conference (LEC)
 Massachusetts State Collegiate Athletic Conference (MASCAC)
 Michigan Intercollegiate Athletic Association (MIAA)
 Middle Atlantic Conferences (MAC) – An umbrella organization of the following three conferences:
 MAC Commonwealth, sponsoring competition in 14 sports, but not football
 MAC Freedom, sponsoring competition in the same set of 14 sports
 Middle Atlantic Conference, sponsoring 13 sports, including football
 Midwest Conference (Midwest or MWC)
 Minnesota Intercollegiate Athletic Conference (MIAC)
 New England Collegiate Conference (NECC)
 New England Small College Athletic Conference (NESCAC)
 New England Women's and Men's Athletic Conference (NEWMAC)
 New Jersey Athletic Conference (NJAC)
 North Atlantic Conference (NAC)
 North Coast Athletic Conference (NCAC)
 Northern Athletics Collegiate Conference (NACC)
 Northwest Conference (NWC)
 Ohio Athletic Conference (OAC)
 Old Dominion Athletic Conference (ODAC)
 Presidents' Athletic Conference (PAC)
 Skyline Conference (Skyline)
 Southern Athletic Association (SAA)
 Southern California Intercollegiate Athletic Conference (SCIAC)
 Southern Collegiate Athletic Conference (SCAC)
 State University of New York Athletic Conference (SUNYAC)
 St. Louis Intercollegiate Athletic Conference (SLIAC)
 United East Conference
 University Athletic Association (UAA)
 Upper Midwest Athletic Conference (UMAC)
 USA South Athletic Conference (USA South)
 Wisconsin Intercollegiate Athletic Conference (WIAC)
 NCAA Division III Independents

Division III football-only conferences
 Eastern Collegiate Football Conference (ECFC)

Division III ice hockey-only conferences

 ECAC East – men's and women's
 ECAC Northeast – men's only
 ECAC West – men's and women's
 Northern Collegiate Hockey Association (NCHA) – men's and women's
 United Collegiate Hockey Conference (UCHC) – men's and women's

Division III lacrosse-only conferences

 Midwest Lacrosse Conference (MLC) – men's only
 Midwest Women's Lacrosse Conference (MWLC) – women's only
 Ohio River Lacrosse Conference (ORLC) – men's and women's

Division III volleyball-only conferences

 Continental Volleyball Conference (CVC) – men's only
 Midwest Collegiate Volleyball League (MCVL) – men's only
 United Volleyball Conference (UVC) – men's only

Media
The NCAA has current media rights contracts with CBS Sports, CBS Sports Network, ESPN, ESPN Plus, Turner Sports and the Golf Channel for coverage of its 88 championships. According to the official NCAA website, ESPN and its associated networks have rights to 21 championships, CBS to 65, Turner Sports to one and NBC's Golf Channel to two. The following are the most prominent championships and rights holders:
 CBS: Men's basketball (NCAA Division I men's basketball tournament, with Turner Sports, and NCAA Division II men's basketball tournament), track and field, ice hockey (women's division I), golf (Divisions II and III, both genders)
 ESPN: Women's basketball (all divisions), baseball, softball, ice hockey (men's Division I), football (all divisions including Div. I FCS), soccer (Division I for both genders)
 Turner Sports: NCAA Division I men's basketball tournament with CBS
NBC and Golf Channel: golf (Division I, both genders)

WestwoodOne has exclusive radio rights to the men's and women's basketball Final Fours to the Men's College World Series (baseball). DirecTV has an exclusive package expanding CBS' coverage of the men's basketball tournament.

From 1998 to 2013, Electronic Arts had a license to develop college sports video games with the NCAA's branding, which included its NCAA Football, NCAA Basketball (formerly NCAA March Madness) and MVP Baseball series. The NCAA's licensing was not required to produce the games, as rights to use teams are not licensed through the NCAA, but through entities such as individual schools and the Collegiate Licensing Company. EA only acquired the license so that it could officially incorporate the Division I men's basketball tournament into its college basketball game series. The NCAA withdrew EA's license due to uncertainties surrounding a series of lawsuits, most notably O'Bannon v. NCAA, involving the use of player likenesses in college sports video games.

Office of Inclusion

Inclusion and Diversity Campaign
The week-long program took place October 1–5, 2018. The aim was to utilize social media platforms in order to promote diversity and inclusion within intercollegiate athletics. Throughout the NCAA's history, there has been controversy as to the levels of diversity present within intercollegiate athletics, and this campaign is the NCAA's most straightforward approach to combatting these issues.

NCAA Inclusion Statement
As a core value, the NCAA believes in and is committed to diversity, inclusion and gender equity among its student-athletes, coaches and administrators. It seeks to establish and maintain an inclusive culture that fosters equitable participation for student-athletes and career opportunities for coaches and administrators from diverse backgrounds. Diversity and inclusion improve the learning environment for all student-athletes and enhance excellence within the Association.

The Office of Inclusion will provide or enable programming and education, which sustains foundations of a diverse and inclusive culture across dimensions of diversity including but not limited to age, race, sex, class, national origin, creed, educational background, religion, gender identity, disability, gender expression, geographical location, income, marital status, parental status, sexual orientation and work experiences.

This statement was adopted by the NCAA Executive Committee in April 2010, and amended by the NCAA Board of Governors in April 2017.

Gender equity and Title IX
While no concrete criteria are given as to a state of gender equity on campuses, an athletics program is considered gender equitable when both women's and men's sports programs reach a consensus.

The basis of Title IX, when amended in 1972 to the 1964 Civil Rights Act, criminalized discrimination on the basis of sex. This plays into intercollegiate athletics in that it helps to maintain gender equity and inclusion in intercollegiate athletics. The NCAA provides many resources to provide information and enforce this amendment.

The NCAA has kept these core values central to its decisions regarding the allocation of championship bids. In April 2016, the Board of Governors announced new requirements for host cities that include protection against discrimination based on sexual orientation or gender identity for all people involved in the event. This decision was prompted by several states passing laws that permit discrimination based on sexual orientation or gender identity in accordance with religious beliefs.

LGBTQ
The LGBTQ community has been under scrutiny and controversy in the public eye of collegiate athletics, but the NCAA moves to support the inclusion of these groups. The NCAA provides many resources concerning the education of the college community on this topic and policies in order to foster diversity. Title IX protects the transgender community within intercollegiate athletics and on college campuses.

On January 19, 2022, the NCAA approved a new policy for transgender athletes, effective immediately, and this replaced their previous policy, which was in place since 2011. Now, the participation of transgender athletes in a particular sport is generally to be governed by the rules of the sport’s national governing body, international federation policy, or IOC policy criteria (though an NCAA committee may provide its own recommendation). This action prompted immediate critique from LGBTQ advocates, including Athlete Ally and former NCAA LGBTQ OneTeam facilitator Dorian Rhea Debussy.

Previously, the NCAA used testosterone levels to qualify transgender athletes for participation. A transgender male student-athlete was not allowed to compete on a male sports team unless they had undergone medical treatment of testosterone for gender transition, and a transgender female student-athlete was not allowed to compete on a women's sports team until completing one calendar year of testosterone suppression treatment. Under this policy, transgender males were ineligible to compete on a women's team, and transgender females were ineligible to compete on a men's team, without changing the team's status to be a mixed team. In December 2021, John Lohn, the editor-in-chief of Swimming World, criticised NCAA policy; writing about transgender swimmer Lia Thomas, he argued that the "one-year suppressant requirement is not nearly stringent enough to create a level playing field between Thomas and the biological females against whom she is racing".

In 2010, the NCAA Executive Committee announced its support and commitment to diversity, inclusion, and gender equality among its student-athletes, coaches, and administrators. The statement included the NCAA's commitment to ensuring that all students have equal opportunities to achieve their academic goals, and coaches and administrators have equal opportunities for career development in a climate of respect. In 2012, the LGBTQ Subcommittee of the NCAA association-wide Committee on Women's Athletics and the Minority Opportunities and Interests Committee commissioned Champions of Respect, a document that provides resources and advocacy that promotes inclusion and equality for LGBTQ student-athletes, coaches, administrators and all others associated with intercollegiate athletics. This resource uses guides from the Women's Sports Foundation It Takes a Team! project for addressing issues related to LGBTQ equality in intercollegiate athletics. The document provides information on specific issues LGBTQ sportspeople face, similarities and differences of these issues on women's and men's teams, policy recommendations and best practices, and legal resources and court cases.

The NCAA expressed concern over Indiana's Religious Freedom Restoration Act that allows businesses to discriminate against people based on their sexual orientation. This bill was proposed just before Indianapolis was set to host the 2015 Men's Basketball Final Four tournament. The bill clashed with the NCAA core values of inclusion and equality, and forced the NCAA to consider moving events out of Indiana. Under pressure from across the nation and fearing the economic loss of being banned from hosting NCAA events, the governor of Indiana, Mike Pence, revised the bill so that businesses could not discriminate based on sexual orientation, race, religion, or disability. The NCAA accepted the revised bill and continues to host events in Indiana. The bill was enacted into law on July 1, 2015.

On September 12, 2016, the NCAA announced that it would pull all seven planned championship events out of North Carolina for the 2016–2017 academic year. This decision was a response to the state passing the Public Facilities Privacy and Security Act (H.B. 2) on March 23, 2016. This law requires people to use public restrooms that correspond with their sex assigned at birth and stops cities from passing laws that protect against discrimination towards gay and transgender people. The NCAA Board of Governors determined that this law would make ensuring an inclusive atmosphere in the host communities challenging, and relocating these championship events best reflects the association's commitment to maintaining an environment that is consistent with its core values. North Carolina has lost the opportunity to host the 2018 Final Four Tournament which was scheduled to be in Charlotte, but is relocated to San Antonio. If H.B. 2 is not repealed, North Carolina could be barred from bidding for events from 2019 to 2022.

Race and ethnicity
Racial/Ethnic minority groups in the NCAA are protected by inclusion and diversity policies put in place to increase sensitivity and awareness to the issues and challenges faced across intercollegiate athletics. The NCAA provides a demographics database that can be openly viewed by the public.

Historically, the NCAA has used its authority in deciding on host cities to promote its core values. The Association also prohibits championship events in states that display the Confederate flag, and at member schools that have abusive or offensive nicknames or mascots based on Native American imagery. Board members wish to ensure that anyone associated with an NCAA championship event will be treated with fairness and respect.

Student-athletes with disabilities
The NCAA defines a disability as a current impairment that has a substantial educational impact on a student's academic performance and requires accommodation. Student-Athletes with disabilities are given education accommodations along with an adapted sports model. The NCAA hosts adapted sports championships for both track and field and swimming and diving as of 2015.

International student athletes
Over the last two decades recruiting international athletes has become a growing trend among NCAA institutions. For example, most German athletes outside of Germany are based at US universities. For many European athletes, the American universities are the only option to pursue an academic and athletic career at the same time. Many of these students come to the US with high academic expectations and aspirations.

College team name changes
As of 2018, there has been a continuation of changing school mascots that are said by some to be based on racist or offensive stereotypes. Universities under NCAA policy are under scrutiny for specifically Native American-inspired mascots. While many colleges have changed their mascots, some have gotten legal permission from the tribe represented and will continue to bear the mascot. This Native American mascot controversy has not been completely settled; however, many issues have been resolved.

Here is a list of notable colleges that changed Native American mascots and/or nicknames in recent history:

 Stanford – Indians to Cardinals (1972); became Cardinal in 1981
 UMass – Redmen and Redwomen to Minutemen and Minutewomen (1972)
 Dartmouth – Indians to Big Green (1974)
 Siena – Indians to Saints (1988)
 Eastern Michigan – Hurons to Eagles (1991)
 St. John's (NY) – Redmen to Red Storm (1994)
 Marquette – Warriors to Golden Eagles (1994)
 Chattanooga – Moccasins to Mocs, suggestive of mockingbirds (1996)
 Miami (OH) – Redskins to RedHawks (1997)
 Seattle – Chieftains to Redhawks (2000)
Colgate – Red Raiders to Raiders (2001)
Quinnipiac – Braves to Bobcats (2002)
 Southeast Missouri State – Indians (men) and Otahkians (women) to Redhawks (2005)
 Louisiana–Monroe – Indians to Warhawks (2006)
 Arkansas State – Indians to Red Wolves (2008)
 North Dakota – Formally dropped Fighting Sioux in 2012; adopted Fighting Hawks in 2015

Others:

 Illinois – Removed Chief Illiniwek as official symbol in 2007. Athletics teams are still called Fighting Illini.
 Bradley, Alcorn State – Both schools stopped using Native American mascots but have retained their Braves nickname.
 William & Mary – Adjusted Tribe logo to remove feathers to comply with NCAA. Athletics teams are still called Tribe. (2007)
 Chattanooga – removed the mascot, Chief Moccanooga and the Moccasin Shoe imagery in 1996; Kept the term, "Mocs", but reassigned its representation to the official State Bird.

Of note: Utah (Utes), Central Michigan (Chippewas), Florida State (Seminoles) and Mississippi College (Choctaws) all appealed successfully to the NCAA after being deemed "hostile and offensive." Each cited positive relationships with neighboring tribes in appeal. UNC Pembroke (Braves), an institution originally created to educate Native Americans and enjoying close ties to the local Lumbee tribe, was approved to continue the use of native-derived imagery without needing an appeal.

Rules violations

Member schools pledge to follow the rules promulgated by the NCAA. Creation of a mechanism to enforce the NCAA's legislation occurred in 1952 after careful consideration by the membership.

Allegations of rules violations are referred to the NCAA's enforcement staff, who monitor information about potential violations, investigate and process violations, provide notice of alleged violations, and bring cases before the NCAA's Committees on Infractions. A preliminary investigation is initiated to determine if an official inquiry is warranted and to categorize any resultant violations as secondary or major. If several violations are found, the NCAA may determine that the school as a whole has exhibited a "lack of institutional control." The institution involved is notified promptly and may appear on its own behalf before the NCAA Committee on Infractions.

Findings of the Committee on Infractions and the resultant sanctions in major cases are reported to the institution. Sanctions will generally include having the institution placed on "probation" for a period of time, in addition to other penalties. The institution may appeal the findings or sanctions to an appeals committee. After considering written reports and oral presentations by representatives of the Committee on Infractions and the institution, the committee acts on the appeal. Action may include accepting the infractions committee's findings and penalty, altering either, or making its own findings and imposing an appropriate penalty.

In cases of particularly egregious misconduct, the NCAA has the power to ban a school from participating in a particular sport, a penalty known as the "Death Penalty". Since 1985, any school that commits major violations during the probationary period can be banned from the sport involved for up to two years. However, when the NCAA opts not to issue a death penalty for a repeat violation, it must explain why it did not do so. This penalty has only been imposed three times in its modern form, most notably when Southern Methodist University's (SMU) football team had its 1987 season canceled due to massive rules violations dating back more than a decade. SMU opted not to field a team in 1988 as well due to the aftershocks from the sanctions, and the program has never recovered. The Mustangs did not post a winning season until 1997, did not appear in their next bowl game until 2009,  did not post consecutive winning seasons until 2011 and 2012, and did not return to the national rankings until 2019. The devastating effect the death penalty had on SMU has reportedly made the NCAA skittish about issuing another one. Since the SMU case, there are only three instances where the NCAA has seriously considered imposing it against a Division I school; it imposed it against Division II Morehouse College's men's soccer team in 2003 and Division III MacMurray College's men's tennis team in 2005. In addition to these cases, the most recent Division I school to be considered was Penn State. This was because of the Jerry Sandusky Incident that consequently almost landed Penn State on the hook for the death penalty. They received a $60 million fine, in addition to forfeited seasons and other sanctions as well. The NCAA later reversed itself by restoring all forfeited seasons and overturning the remaining sanctions.

Additionally, in particularly egregious cases of rules violations, coaches, athletic directors, and athletic support staff can be barred from working for any NCAA member school without permission from the NCAA. This procedure is known as a "show-cause penalty" (not to be confused with an order to show cause in the legal sense). Theoretically, a school can hire someone with a "show cause" on their record during the time the show cause order is in effect only with permission from the NCAA Infractions Committee. The school assumes the risks and stigma of hiring such a person. It may then end up being sanctioned by the NCAA and the Infractions Committee for their choice, possibly losing athletic scholarships, revenue from schools who would not want to compete with that other school, and the ability for their games to be televised, along with restrictions on recruitment and practicing times. As a result, a show-cause order essentially has the effect of blackballing individuals from being hired for the duration of the order.

One of the most famous scandals in NCAA history involved Heisman Trophy-winning quarterback Cam Newton of the Auburn Tigers in 2011. As a direct effect of not being compensated for his college athletics, Cam Newton's family allegedly sought upwards of $100,000 for him to instead play at Mississippi State. This was revealed days before the conference SEC championship game; however, Cam Newton was later reinstated as there was insufficient evidence against him.

Sponsors
The NCAA has a two-tier sponsorship division. AT&T, Coca-Cola, and Capital One are NCAA Corporate Champions, all others are NCAA Corporate Partners.

Finances
As a governing body for amateur sports the NCAA is classified as a tax-exempt not-for-profit organization. As such, it is not required to pay most taxes on income that for-profit private and public corporations are subject to. The NCAA's business model of prohibiting salaries for collegial athletes has been challenged in court, but a 2015 case was struck down. As of 2014 the NCAA reported that it had over $600 million in unrestricted net assets in its annual report. During 2014 the NCAA also reported almost a billion dollars of revenue, contributing to a "budget surplus" – revenues in excess of disbursements for that year – of over $80 million. Over $700 million of that revenue total was from licensing TV rights to its sporting events. In addition, the NCAA also earns money through investment growth of its endowment fund. Established in 2004 with $45 million, the fund has grown to over $380 million in 2014.

NCAA expenditures
According to the NCAA, it receives most of its annual revenue from two sources: Division I Men's Basketball television and marketing rights, and championships ticket sales. According to the NCAA, "that money is distributed in more than a dozen ways – almost all of which directly support NCAA schools, conferences and nearly half a million student-athletes."

In 2017 total NCAA revenues were in excess of $1.06 billion. Division I basketball television and marketing rights generated $821.4 million, and "championships ticket sales" totaled $129.4 million. Other "smaller streams of revenue, such as membership dues" contributed an unspecified amount.

Expenses by category
The NCAA provided a breakdown of how those revenues were in turn spent, organizing pay-outs and expenses into some 14 basic categories. By far the largest went to Sports Scholarship and Sponsorship Funds, funding for sports and student scholarships under the Division I Basketball Performance Fund, expenses incurred in producing Division I Championships (including team food, travel, and lodging), the Student Assistance Fund, and Student Athlete Services. Together these top five recipients accounted for 65% of all NCAA expenditures. General and Administrative expenses for running the NCAA day-to-day operations totaled approximately 4% of monies paid out, and other association-wide expenses, including legal services, communications, and business insurance totaled 8%.

The categories:
$210.8M Sport Sponsorship and Scholarship Funds
Distributed to Division I schools to help fund NCAA sports and provide scholarships for college athletes.

$160.5M Division I Basketball Performance Fund
Distributed to Division I conferences and independent schools based on their performance in the men’s basketball tournament over a six-year rolling period. The money is used to fund NCAA sports and provide scholarships for college athletes.

$96.7M Division I Championships
Provides college athletes the opportunity to compete for a championship and includes support for team travel, food and lodging.

$82.2M Student Assistance Fund
Distributed to Division I student-athletes for essential needs that arise during their time in college.

$71.8M Student-Athlete Services
Includes funding for catastrophic injury insurance, drug testing, student-athlete leadership programs, postgraduate scholarships and additional Association-wide championships support.

$50.3M Division I Equal Conference Fund
Distributed equally among Division I basketball-playing conferences that meet athletic and academic standards to play in the men's basketball tournament. The money is used to fund NCAA sports and provide scholarships for college athletes.

$46.7M Academic Enhancement Fund
Distributed to Division I schools to assist with academic programs and services.

$42.3M Division II Allocation
Funds championships, grants and other initiatives for Division II college athletes.

$39.6M Membership Support Services
Covers costs related to NCAA governance committees and the annual NCAA Convention.
 
$28.2M Division III Allocation
Funds championships, grants and other initiatives for Division III college athletes.

$9.5M Division I Conference Grants
Distributed to Division I conferences for programs that enhance officiating, compliance, minority opportunities and more.

$3.3M Educational Programs
Supports various educational services for members to help prepare student-athletes for life, including the Women Coaches Academy, the Emerging Leaders Seminars and the Pathway Program.

$74.3M Other Association-Wide Expenses
Includes support for Association-wide legal services, communications and business insurance.

$39.7M General and Administrative Expenses
Funds the day-to-day operations of the NCAA national office, including administrative and financial services, information technology and facilities management.

According to the NCAA, the 2017 fiscal year was the first in which its revenues topped $1.0 billion. The increase in revenue from 2016 came from hikes in television and marketing fees, plus greater monies generated from championship events and investment income.

An ESPN critique of the organization's 2017 financials indicated some $560.3 million of the total $956 million paid out went back to its roughly 1,100 member institutions in 24 sports in all three divisions, as well as $200 million for a one-time payment the NCAA made to schools to fund additional programs.

The Division I basketball tournament alone generated some $761 million, with another $60 million in 2016–17 marketing rights. With increases in rights fees it is estimated the basketball tournament will generate some $869 million for the 2018 championship.

Player compensation proposals

The NCAA has limited the amount of compensation that individual players can receive to scholarships equal to school tuition and related expenses. This rule has generated controversy, in light of the large amounts of revenues that schools earn from sports from TV contracts, ticket sales, and licensing and merchandise. Several commentators have discussed whether the NCAA limit on player compensation violates antitrust laws. There is a consensus among economists that the NCAA's compensation caps for men's basketball and football players benefit the athletes' schools (through rent-seeking) at the expense of the athletes. Economists have subsequently characterized the NCAA as a cartel and collusive monopsony.

Pro-rating payouts to Division I basketball players in proportion to the size of revenues its championship tournament generates relative to the NCAA's total annual revenues would be one possible approach, but will open the door to litigation by students and schools adversely affected by such a formula.

According to a national study by the National College Players Association (NCPA) and the Drexel University Sport Management Department, the average FBS “full” athletic scholarship falls short of the full cost of attending each school by an average of $3285 during 2011–12 school year, and leaves the vast majority of full scholarship players living below the federal poverty line. 

In 2020, the NCAA Board of Governors announced that they supported rule changes that would permit players to receive athletics-related endorsements from third-parties. All divisions were expected to adopt new rules relating to the use of players' names, images, and likenesses before the 2021–2022 academic year begins.

On May 6, 2021, Governor Brian Kemp signed Bill 617 into law, giving collegiate athletes the ability to profit off their Name, Image and Likeness. The University of Georgia have said they will immediately compensate their student athletes, while Georgia Tech and Georgia State University have not set anything yet.

On June 21, 2021, the U.S. Supreme Court held unanimously in National Collegiate Athletic Association v. Alston that the NCAA's restrictions on education-related payments were unlawfully in violation of Sherman Act's anti-trust and trade regulations. Though this holding did not address restrictions on direct compensation payment to athletes, it also opened the door for the possibly of future court cases concerning this matter.

The NCAA announced on July 1, 2021, that as a result of O'Bannon and numerous state laws giving college players the ability to manage their publicity, the board had agreed to new rules that removed restrictions on college athletes from entering paid endorsements and other sponsorship deals, and from using agents to manage their publicity. Students would still be required to inform the school of all such activities, with the school to make determinations if those activities violate state and local laws.

On the first day of effect for the NIL rule change (July 1), athletes such as D'Eriq King (Miami (FL) quarterback), Justyn Ross (Clemson wide receiver), Bo Nix (Auburn quarterback), Antwan Owen (Jackson State defensive end), McKenzie Milton (Florida State quarterback), Malik Cunningham (Louisville Quarterback), Michael Penix Jr. (Indiana quarterback), Spencer Rattler (Oklahoma quarterback), Lexi Sun (Nebraska volleyball), Paige Bueckers (UConn basketball) and twins Hanna & Haley Cavinder (Fresno State basketball), all signed deals and/or unveiled trademarks to profit off of their names, images, and likenesses. As of day one, LSU gymnast Olivia Dunne is projected to be the highest earning college athlete of 2021–2022, out of both men's and women's sports.

The new NIL agreement has given student athletes big time deals and opportunities to put theirselves out there and gain profit using their name, image, and likeness. For example, Ga’Quincy McKinstry, quarterback from Alabama signed a deal with Kool-Aid. Not only can they partner up with companies, student athlete's can get paid for other talents; such as, singing.

Russell Steinberg in 2021 says, "In addition to his prowess on the football field, where he has a shot at tying the school record for most starts, Marshall’s Will Ulmer is a talented musician who wasn’t able to earn money using his own name — until now. He had been going by “Lucky Bill” to avoid running afoul of NCAA regulations, but now says he is ready to book shows using his real name" (Steinberg 2021). The NIL has allowed Ulmer great opportunities to further pursue his football and musician career.

Some companies have partnered up with multiple athletes and created a team of their own. Degree, the deodorant brand, started a team of 14 student athletes to help promote their brand. Degree calls this team Breaking Limits. "The Unilever-owned antiperspirant brand has committed $5 million over the next five years to inspire people to break limits. The first group of athletes that Degree has selected represent a diverse range of backgrounds regarding race, gender, and sport, and their stories will be unveiled on Instagram. These athletes will also have the chance to participate in events to help their local communities" (Steinberg 2021).

Individual awards

The NCAA presents a number of different individual awards, including:
 NCAA Award of Valor (not given every year); selection is based on the heroic action occurring during the academic year.
 NCAA Gerald R. Ford Award, honoring an individual who has provided significant leadership as an advocate for intercollegiate athletics.
 NCAA Inspiration Award (not given every year); selection is based on inspirational action.
 NCAA Sportsmanship Award, honoring student-athletes who have demonstrated one or more of the ideals of sportsmanship.
 NCAA Theodore Roosevelt Award, the highest honor that the NCAA can confer on an individual.
 NCAA Woman of the Year Award, honoring a senior student-athlete who has distinguished herself throughout her collegiate career in academics, athletics, service, and leadership.
 Elite 90 Award, honoring the student-athlete with the highest cumulative GPA who has reached the competition at the finals site for each of the NCAA's 90 men's and women's championships (in Divisions I, II, and III, plus "National Collegiate" championships open to schools from more than one division).
 Silver Anniversary Awards, honoring six distinguished former student-athletes on the 25th anniversary of their college graduation.
 The Flying Wedge Award, one of the NCAA's highest honors exemplifying outstanding leadership and service to the NCAA.
 Today's Top 10 Award, honoring ten outstanding senior student-athletes.
 Walter Byers Scholarship, honoring the top male and female scholar-athletes.

In previous years, the NCAA has presented the following awards at its NCAA Honors event: Astronaut Salute, Business Leader Salute, Congressional Medal of Honor Salute, Governor Salute, Olympians Salute, Performing Arts Salute, Presidents Cabinet Salute, Prominent National Media Salute, Special Recognition Awards, U.S. House of Representatives Salute, and U.S. Senate Salute.

Other collegiate athletic organizations
The NCAA is the dominant, but not the only, collegiate athletic organization in the United States. Several other such collegiate athletic organizations exist.

In the United States
 National Association of Intercollegiate Athletics (NAIA)
 National Junior College Athletic Association (NJCAA) – two-year colleges (does not operate in California or the Pacific Northwest)
 California Community College Athletic Association (CCCAA) – two-year colleges in California
 Northwest Athletic Conference (NWAC) – two-year colleges in Washington, Oregon and Idaho
 National Christian College Athletic Association (NCCAA)
 United States Collegiate Athletic Association (USCAA)
 Association for Intercollegiate Athletics for Women (AIAW) – disbanded in 1982, after NCAA began sponsoring championships in women's sports

Foreign equivalents
 Australia: UniSport Australia and other school affiliations such as Athletic Association of the Great Public Schools of New South Wales (GPS), and Combined Associated Schools (CAS)
 Canada: U Sports, and Canadian Collegiate Athletic Association (CCAA)
 Indonesia: Liga Mahasiswa (LIMA)
 Philippines National Collegiate Athletic Association (Philippines) (NCAA), and University Athletic Association of the Philippines (UAAP)
 United Kingdom: British Universities & Colleges Sport
 South Africa: Varsity Sports (South Africa)

International governing body
 International University Sports Federation (FISU) (Fédération Internationale du Sport Universitaire)

See also

 College athletics in the United States
 College club sports in the United States
 College recruiting
 College rivalries
 Higher education in the United States
 Homosexuality in modern sports
 List of college athletic programs by U.S. state
 List of college sports team nicknames
 List of U.S. college mascots
 NCAA Native American mascot decision

Notes and references

Notes

References

Further reading

External links

 

 
1906 establishments in the United States
College sports governing bodies in the United States
Non-profit organizations based in Indianapolis
Sports organizations established in 1906